Commissioner Thomas Henry Howard OF (July 17, 1849 – July 1, 1923) was the Second Chief of the Staff of The Salvation Army, succeeding Bramwell Booth on his appointment as General on the death of his father William Booth in 1912.

Biography
Howard was born on July 17, 1849 in Ilkeston in Derbyshire to Hannah and William Howard. He worked as a builder and spent a night in prayer before making the decision to join The Salvation Army. After a short period spent at the Whitechapel Corps, he was appointed to the work of officer training.

In 1884 he was transferred to Australia, where he was instrumental in expanding the work of the Army, and was the first Commander of The Salvation Army Australia Southern Territory, from 1886 to 1889. Later appointments included British Commissioner, International Training Commissioner and Foreign Secretary at the International Headquarters in London.

Howard was appointed The Salvation Army's Second Chief of Staff by General Bramwell Booth in 1912, a post he held until his retirement from active service in 1919. In 1920 he was awarded the Order of the Founder, the Salvation Army's most prestigious award. Commissioner Howard died in Margate in Kent in 1923.

Two of the children he had with his wife Martha (1847-1937) died young. His son John Howard married Florence Annie Lawley, the daughter of Commissioner John Lawley.

He died on July 1, 1923. Like many prominent Salvationists, T. Henry Howard is buried in Abney Park Cemetery.

References

External links
 Howard in The New York Times October 5, 1908 Retrieved on 2008-10-31
 
 
 Howard on Salvation Army Collectables

1849 births
1923 deaths
Salvation Army officers
Commissioners in The Salvation Army
English Salvationists
Burials at Abney Park Cemetery
People from Ilkeston